Nevada is divided into four congressional districts, each represented by a member of the United States House of Representatives.  After the 2010 census, Nevada gained a fourth House seat.

Current districts and representatives
List of members of the United States House delegation from Nevada, district boundaries, and the district political ratings according to the CPVI. In the 118th United States Congress the delegation has four members, with three Democrats and one Republican.

Historical and present district boundaries
Table of United States congressional district boundary maps in the State of Nevada, presented chronologically. All redistricting events that took place in Nevada between 1983 and 2013 are shown.

Obsolete districts
Nevada Territory's at-large congressional district
Nevada's at-large congressional district

See also

List of United States congressional districts
United States congressional delegations from Nevada

References